Cipanas is a district in the extreme northwest corner of Cianjur Regency in West Java, Indonesia. It had an area of 67.28 km2 and a population of 103,911 at the 2010 Census. which had increased to 113,592 at the 2020 Census.

Administration
Cipanas consists of 7 villages namely:
 Batulawang
 Ciloto
 Cimacan
 Cipanas
 Palasari
 Sindangjaya
 Sindanglaya
All the villages addressed with the same postcode 43253.

References

External links
 

Cianjur Regency
Districts of West Java